Pentagrammaton may refer to:

 Yahshuah, a constructed form of the name of Jesus
 Pentagrammaton (album), a 2010 album by Enthroned

See also
 Pentagram, the shape of a five-pointed star drawn with five straight strokes
 Tetragrammaton (disambiguation)